VT Mobile Aerospace Engineering (VT MAE) provides commercial aircraft maintenance to passenger and cargo aircraft to many of the world's leading airlines. It is located within the Brookley Aeroplex in Mobile, Alabama and is one of the largest employers in Mobile County, Alabama.  The work force includes technical, engineering, and administrative personnel, consisting largely of FAA licensed aircraft mechanics.  The company was established in September 1990 by ST Engineering.

In June 2018, VT Mobile Aerospace Engineering (VT MAE) opened a second facility at the Pensacola International Airport in Pensacola, Florida to complement the operations in Mobile, Alabama.

Facilities
The facility contains nine aircraft hangars equipped with eight wide-body and ten narrow-body aircraft bays for aircraft maintenance, repair, and operations (MRO).  MRO services are provided for Airbus' A300, A310, A320, A330, A340, and Boeing's B727, B737, B747, B757, B767, B777, and MD-11.  The company also provides passenger-to-freighter (PTF) conversions for the B727, B757, and McDonnell Douglas DC-10 and provides avionics upgrades  for the MD-80, DC-9, DC-10, and MD-11.

The new Pensacola, FL 173,500 sf. ft. facility is capable of housing two (2) B777-300ERs, four (4) B757s, or up to six (6) A321s.

References

Companies based in Mobile, Alabama
Aerospace companies of the United States